Powranna is a rural locality in the local government area of Northern Midlands in the Central region of Tasmania. The 2016 census determined a population of 25 for the state suburb of Powranna.

History
Powranna was gazetted as a locality in 1959. The name is an Aboriginal word for “black snake”.

Geography
The South Esk River forms the eastern boundary.

Road infrastructure
The Midland Highway (National route 1) enters from the north-west and runs through to the south-east before exiting. Route B53 (Powranna Road) starts at an intersection with route 1 and runs south-west before exiting.

References

Localities of Northern Midlands Council
Towns in Tasmania